Limulus clotting factor B is an enzyme. This enzyme catalyses the following chemical reaction

 Selective cleavage of -Arg98-Ile- bond in limulus proclotting enzyme to form active clotting enzyme

From the hemocyte granules of the horseshoe crabs Limulus and Tachypleus. This enzyme is downstream of Limulus clotting factor C, but upstream of Limulus clotting enzyme.

References

External links 
 

EC 3.4.21